Carnival of Sins: Live is a 2-CD live album by American rock band Mötley Crüe. It was released in 2006 on Mötley Records.

Background
The album features the Grand Rapids, Michigan performance from the band's 2005-2006 Carnival of Sins tour. Carnival of Sins is also available on DVD, featuring the album in its entirety. In addition, Wal-Mart released the 2 discs individually as Carnival of Sins vol. 1 and vol. 2. Other than a few vocal and guitar overdubs to fix some wrong notes/vocals from the concert, the record is mostly an unoverdubbed live album with the usual edits to make it a two-CD offering.

Track listing 
Disc 1
 "Shout at the Devil"
 "Too Fast for Love"
 "Ten Seconds to Love"
 "Red Hot"
 "On With the Show"
 "Too Young to Fall in Love"
 "Looks That Kill"
 "Louder Than Hell"
 "Live Wire"
 "Girls, Girls, Girls"
 "Wild Side"

Disc 2
 "Don't Go Away Mad (Just Go Away)"
 "Primal Scream"
 "Glitter"
 "Without You"
 "Home Sweet Home"
 "Dr. Feelgood"
 "Same Ol' Situation (S.O.S.)"
 "Sick Love Song"
 "If I Die Tomorrow"
 "Kickstart My Heart"
 "Helter Skelter"
 "Anarchy in the U.K."

Personnel 
Vince Neil – lead vocals, acoustic and rhythm guitar
Mick Mars – lead guitar, backing vocals
Nikki Sixx – bass, keyboards, theremin, backing vocals
Tommy Lee – drums, percussion, piano, backing vocals

Certifications

References 

Mötley Crüe live albums
2006 live albums
2006 video albums
Mötley Crüe video albums
Live video albums